Alan Lee Berman (born July 10, 1943) also known as Lanny Berman, is an American psychologist, psychotherapist, and suicidologist. He is an adjunct professor of Psychiatry and Behavioral Sciences at Johns Hopkins School of Medicine. Berman was formerly the executive director of the American Association of Suicidology. He is a fellow of the American Psychological Association and the International Association for Suicide Research. Berman has a private practice in psychological and forensic consultation.

Education 
Berman earned a Bachelor of Arts degree from Johns Hopkins University and a Doctor of Philosophy from Catholic University of America. His 1970 dissertation was titled The Effect Of Videotape Self-Confrontation On Level Of Ego Functioning And Thought Disturbance In Non-Paranoid, Process Schizophrenics.

Career 
Berman worked at American University from 1969 to 1991, eventually becoming a tenured full professor. He served as the president of the American Association of Suicidology from 1984 to 1985. After 1991, he became a Distinguished Adjunct Professor at American University. The same year, he was named the director of the National Center for the Study and Prevention of Suicide at the Washington School of Psychiatry. In January 1995, Berman became the executive director of the American Association of Suicidology. He retired from that position on July 1, 2014. In 2009 and 2011, he was elected the president of the International Association for Suicide Prevention. Berman is an adjunct professor of Psychiatry and Behavioral Sciences at Johns Hopkins School of Medicine.

Berman is a Diplomate in Clinical Psychology from the American Board of Professional Psychology. He is a fellow of the American Psychological Association and the International Academy of Suicide Research. Berman was the doctoral advisor of Michael Hendricks. Berman has a private practice in psychological and forensic consultation in Chevy Chase, Maryland.

Awards and honors 
In 1982, Berman received the Shneidman Award for Outstanding Contributions in Research in Suicidology. In 2006, he received the Louis I. Dublin Award for service and contributions to the field of suicide prevention. In 2015, he received a Distinguished Alumni Award from the Catholic University of America's Department of Psychology.

Selected works

Articles

Books 

 
 Reprinted in Italian: Il suicidio nell’ adolescenza: Valutazione e intervento (1999).  Roma: Edizioni Scientifiche Magi.
 
 
 Maris, Ronald W., Berman, Alan L., Maltsberger, John T., & Yufit, Robert. (Eds.) (1992).  Assessment and Prediction of Suicide. New York: Guilford.  Chosen as Book-of-the-Month by the Behavioral Science Book Service.).
 Leenaars, Antoon A., Berman, Alan L., Cantor, Pamela, & Maris, Ronald W. (Eds.).  (1993).  Suicidology: Essays in Honor of Edwin S. Shneidman. Nothvale, New Jersey: Jason Aronson.
 Berman, Alan L., Jobes, David A., & Silverman, Morton M. (2006).  Youth Suicide: Assessment and Intervention (2nd Ed.), Washington, D.C.: American Psychological Association.
 Berman, Alan L. & Pompili, Maurizio. (Eds.). (2011). Suicide Risk Associated with Medical Conditions. Washington, DC: American Association of Suicidology.

References

External links 

 
 

20th-century American educators
20th-century American psychologists
21st-century American educators
21st-century American psychologists
Living people
Fellows of the American Psychological Association
Suicidologists
1943 births
American psychotherapists
Johns Hopkins University alumni
Johns Hopkins University faculty
Catholic University of America alumni
American University faculty and staff